Vriesea bleheri is a plant species in the genus Vriesea. This species is endemic to Brazil. The name is sometimes spelled Vriesea bleherae.

Cultivars
Cultivars include:
 Vriesea 'Elvira'
 Vriesea 'Nissa'
 Vriesea 'Purple Delight'
 Vriesea 'Serenity Gold'
 Vriesea 'Serenity Orange'
 Vriesea 'Serenity Red'
 Vriesea 'Tropical Princess'

References

bleheri
Flora of Brazil